Joe Sawyer (born Joseph Sauers, August 29, 1906 – April 21, 1982) was a Canadian film actor. He appeared in more than 200 films between 1927 and 1962, and was sometimes billed under his birth name.

Early life 

Sawyer was born August 29, 1906 as Joseph Sauers in Guelph, Ontario, Canada. His parents were German. In his 20s he went to Los Angeles to pursue a career in films.

Career 

Sawyer gained acting experience in the Pasadena Playhouse. Productions in which he performed there included Quinneys, The Wolves, and White Wings.

Popular roles that he portrayed included Sergeant Biff O'Hara in the Rin Tin Tin television program, a film, and on radio. On Stories of the Century in 1954, he portrayed  Butch Cassidy, a role which he repeated in the 1958 episode "The Outlaw Legion" of the syndicated western series Frontier Doctor. Sawyer also appeared on ABC's, Maverick, Sugarfoot, Peter Gunn, and Surfside 6 as well as NBC's Bat Masterson.

Death 

Sawyer died April 21, 1982, in Ashland, Oregon from liver cancer. He was 75. His interment was in Oregon.

Selected filmography 

 The Public Enemy (1931) as Pool player (uncredited)
 New Adventures of Get Rich Quick Wallingford (1931) as Willis the Newspaper Reporter (uncredited)
 Surrender (1931) as Sergeant Muller
 Maker of Men (1931) as Bennett the Monroe Coach (uncredited)
 Arsene Lupin (1932) as Leroux (uncredited)
 Shopworn (1932) as Construction Camp Worker (uncredited)
 Young Bride (1932) as Library Patron Seeking Aphrodite (uncredited)
 Huddle (1932) as Slater
 Forgotten Commandments (1932) as Ivan Ivanovitch Petroff (uncredited)
 Olsen's Big Moment (1933) as 'Dapper' Danny Reynolds
 Hold Your Man (1933) as Policeman at Reformatory (uncredited)
 College Humor (1933) as Tex Roust
 The Stranger's Return (1933) as Farmhand (uncredited)
 Three Cornered Moon (1933) as Swimming Pool Instructor (uncredited)
 Golden Harvest (1933) as Farmhand (uncredited)
 Saturday's Millions (1933) as Coach
 Ace of Aces (1933) as Capt. Daly
 College Coach (1933) as Holcomb
 Eskimo (1933) as Sergeant Hunt (uncredited)
 Blood Money (1933) as Red (uncredited)
 Jimmy and Sally (1933) as Slug Morgan (uncredited)
 Son of a Sailor (1933) as Slug (uncredited)
 Jimmy the Gent (1934) as Mike (uncredited)
 Wharf Angel (1934) as Sailor on 'The Coyote' (uncredited)
 Looking for Trouble (1934) as Henchman Max Stanley
 Sing and Like It (1934) as Gunner – Hood
 Stamboul Quest (1934) as Soldier Escorting Doktor (uncredited)
 The Notorious Sophie Lang (1934) as Building Guard (uncredited)
 Death on the Diamond (1934) as Spencer
 The Case of the Howling Dog (1934) as Carl Trask (uncredited)
 Against the Law (1934) as McManus (uncredited)
 Gridiron Flash (1934) as Coach Eversmith
 The Prescott Kid (1934) as Marshal Willoughby
 College Rhythm (1934) as Spud Miller (uncredited)
 Behold My Wife! (1934) as Morton (uncredited)
 The Westerner (1934) as Bob Lockhart
 The Band Plays On (1934) as Mr. Thomas
 Sequoia (1934) as Forest Ranger (uncredited)
 The Whole Town's Talking (1935) as Nick, Mannion's Henchman (uncredited)
 Car 99 (1935) as Whitey
 Eight Bells (1935) as Gates (uncredited)
 Air Hawks (1935) as Henchman (uncredited)
 The Informer (1935) as Barty Mulholland
 The Arizonian (1935) as Henchman Keeler
 Broadway Gondolier (1935) as 'Red'
 Man on the Flying Trapeze (1935) as Ambulance Driver (uncredited)
 Little Big Shot (1935) as Doré's Henchman #1
 Special Agent (1935) as Ned Rich
 Moonlight on the Prairie (1935) as Luke Thomas
 I Found Stella Parish (1935) as Chuck
 Frisco Kid (1935) as Slugs Crippen
 Man of Iron (1935) as Crawford
 Freshman Love (1936) as Coach Kendall
 The Petrified Forest (1936) as Jackie
 The Leathernecks Have Landed (1936) as Sgt. Regan
 The Walking Dead (1936) as Trigger Smith
 The Country Doctor (1936) as Joe, Logger lifting log (uncredited)
 Pride of the Marines (1936) as Tennessee
 Big Brown Eyes (1936) as Jack Sully
 Special Investigator (1936) as Jim 'Jimmy' Plummer
 And Sudden Death (1936) as Police Sgt. Sanborn
 High Tension (1936) as Terry Madden
 A Son Comes Home (1936) as First Truck Driver (uncredited)
 Crash Donovan (1936) as Henchman (uncredited)
 Murder with Pictures (1936) as Inspector Bacon
 Two in a Crowd (1936) as Bonelli's Henchman
 Rose Bowl (1936) as Announcer (uncredited)
 The Accusing Finger (1936) as Father Reed – the Priest
 Great Guy (1936) as Burton
 Black Legion (1937) as Cliff Moore
 Navy Blues (1937) as Chips
 Motor Madness (1937) as Steve Dolan
 They Gave Him a Gun (1937) as Doyle – Gangster (uncredited)
 San Quentin (1937) as 'Sailor Boy' Hansen
 Slim (1937) as Wilcox
 Midnight Madonna (1937) as Wolfe
 A Dangerous Adventure (1937) as Dutch
 Reported Missing (1937) as 'Brad' Martin
 The Lady Fights Back (1937) as Swede Jannsen
 Tarzan's Revenge (1938) as Olaf Punch
 Stolen Heaven (1938) as Bako
 Passport Husband (1938) as Duke Selton
 Always in Trouble (1938) as Buster Mussendorfer
 The Storm (1938) as Kelly – Wireless Operator
 Heart of the North (1938) as Red Crocker
 Gambling Ship (1938) as Tony Garzoni
 My Son Is a Criminal (1939) as Policeman (uncredited)
 You Can't Get Away with Murder (1939) as Red
 The Lady and the Mob (1939) as Blinky Mack
 Confessions of a Nazi Spy (1939) as Werner Renz
 Union Pacific (1939) as Shamus (uncredited)
 Inside Information  (1939) as Detective Grazzi
 Frontier Marshal (1939) as Curley Bill
 I Stole a Million (1939) as Billings
 Rio (1939) as Prison Guard (uncredited)
 Sabotage (1939) as Gardner
 The Roaring Twenties (1939) as Sergeant Pete Jones
 Man from Montreal (1939) as Biff Anders 
 The Grapes of Wrath (1940) as Keene Ranch foreman
 Honeymoon Deferred (1940) as Detective James
 The House Across the Bay (1940) as Charley
 Women Without Names (1940) as Principal Keeper Grimley (uncredited)
 Dark Command (1940) as Bushropp
 King of the Lumberjacks (1940) as Jigger, a Lumberjack
 Lucky Cisco Kid (1940) as Bill Stevens
 Wildcat Bus (1940) as Burke
 The Long Voyage Home (1940) as Davis
 Melody Ranch (1940) as Jasper Wildhack
 The Border Legion (1940) as Jim Gulden
 Santa Fe Trail (1940) as Kitzmiller
 The Lady from Cheyenne (1941) as Sheriff 'Noisy' Burkett, Henchman (uncredited)
 Sergeant York (1941) as Sergeant Early
 Down in San Diego (1941) as Dutch
 Belle Starr (1941) as John Cole
 Tanks a Million (1941) as Sgt. William Ames
 Last of the Duanes (1941) as Bull Lossomer
 Down Mexico Way (1941) as Allen
 Swamp Water (1941) as Hardy Ragan
 They Died with Their Boots On (1941) as Sergeant Doolittle
 You're in the Army Now (1941) as Sergeant Madden
 Hay Foot (1942) as Sergeant Ames
 Brooklyn Orchid (1942) as Eddie Corbett
 Sundown Jim (1942) as Ben Moffitt
 Wrecking Crew (1942) as Fred Bunce
 Fall In (1942) as Sgt. William Ames
 The McGuerins from Brooklyn (1942) as Eddie Corbett
 The Outlaw (1943) as Charley Woodruff
 Prairie Chickens (1943) as Albertson
 Taxi, Mister (1943) as Eddie Corbett
 Buckskin Frontier (1943) as Brannigan
 Cowboy in Manhattan (1943) as Louie
 Hit the Ice (1943) as Buster
 Alaska Highway (1943) as Roughhouse
 Yanks Ahoy (1943) as Sgt. Ames
 Let's Face It (1943) as Sergeant Wiggins
 Sleepy Lagoon (1943) as Lumpy
 Tarzan's Desert Mystery (1943) as Karl Straeder
 Tornado (1943) as Charlie Boswell
 Moon Over Las Vegas (1944) as Joe
 Hey, Rookie (1944) as Sergeant
 South of Dixie (1944) as Ernest Hatcher
 Raiders of Ghost City (1944) as Idaho Jones
 The Singing Sheriff (1944) as Squint
 High Powered (1945) as Spike Kenny
 Brewster's Millions (1945) as Hacky Smith
 The Naughty Nineties (1945) as Bailey
 Deadline at Dawn (1946) as Babe Dooley
 Gilda (1946) as Casey
 Joe Palooka, Champ (1946) as Lefty
 The Runaround (1946) as Hutchins
 Inside Job (1946) as Police Capt. Thomas
 G.I. War Brides (1946) as Sgt. Frank Moraski
 Christmas Eve (1947) as Private Detective Gimlet
 Roses Are Red (1947) as Police Lt. Rocky Wall
 Big Town After Dark (1947) as Monk
 A Double Life (1947) as Det. Pete Bonner
 If You Knew Susie (1948) as Zero Zantini
 Here Comes Trouble (1948) as Officer Ames
 Half Past Midnight (1948) as Det. Lt. Joe Nash
 Fighting Father Dunne (1948) as Steve Davis
 Coroner Creek (1948) as Frank Yordy
 Fighting Back (1948) as Police Sgt. Scudder
 The Untamed Breed (1948) as Hoy Keegan
 Two Knights from Brooklyn (1949) as Eddie Corbett (archive footage)
 The Lucky Stiff (1949) as Tony
 Kazan (1949)
 Tucson (1949) as Tod Bryant
 The Gay Amigo (1949) as Sergeant McNulty
 Stagecoach Kid (1949) as Thatcher
 Pinky (1949) as Sandz Jepson
 Deputy Marshall (1949) as Eli Cressett / Colt Redwood
 And Baby Makes Three (1949) as Motorcycle Cop (uncredited)
 The Traveling Saleswoman (1950) as Cactus Jack
 Blondie's Hero (1950) as Sgt. Gateson
 Operation Haylift (1950) as George Swallow
 Curtain Call at Cactus Creek (1950) as Jake
 The Flying Missile (1950) as Quartermaster 'Fuss' Payne
 Pride of Maryland (1951) as Knuckles
 Comin' Round the Mountain (1951) as Kalem McCoy
 As You Were (1952) as Sgt. Ames
 Indian Uprising (1952) as Sgt. Maj. Phineas T. Keogh
 Red Skies of Montana (1952) as R.A. (Pop) Miller
 Deadline – U.S.A. (1952) as Whitey Franks (uncredited)
 Mr. Walkie Talkie (1952) as Sgt. Ames
 It Came from Outer Space (1953) as Frank Daylon
 Taza, Son of Cochise (1954) as Sgt. Hamma
 Riding Shotgun (1954) as Tom Biggert
 Johnny Dark (1954) as Carl Svenson
 The Kettles in the Ozarks (1956) as Bancroft Baines
 The Killing (1956) as Mike O'Reilly
 The Challenge of Rin Tin Tin (1958) as Sgt. 'Biff' O'Hara
 North to Alaska (1960) as Land Commissioner
 How the West Was Won (1962) as Riverboat Officer (uncredited)

References

External links

1906 births
1982 deaths
Canadian male film actors
Deaths from cancer in Oregon
Deaths from liver cancer
Burials in Oregon
Male actors from Ontario
People from Guelph
Canadian expatriate male actors in the United States
Western (genre) television actors
Canadian male stage actors
20th-century Canadian male actors